Elachista sylvestris is a moth of the family Elachistidae. It is found in the United States, where it has been recorded from Maine, Ohio, Illinois and New Hampshire.

The wingspan is 8-8.5 mm. The forewings are blackish brown with a faint golden brown luster. There is a silvery patch at the base of the wing, a silvery fascia just before the middle, a silvery tornal spot and a costal silvery spot. The hindwings are dark brown. Adults have been recorded on wing from May to July.

The larvae feed on Poa sylvestris. They mine the stem leaves of their host plant. The mine starts as an inconspicuous linear mine along the margin of the leaf. The larva vacates this mine, entering a leaf near the tip and mining downward, consuming most of the parenchyma. This second mine is extends across the leaf blade. Mining larvae can be found in April and early May. The larvae are pale yellow.

References

sylvestris
Moths described in 1920
Moths of North America